Hector-Martin Lefuel (14 November 1810 – 31 December 1880) was a French architect, best known for his work on the Palais du Louvre, including Napoleon III's Louvre expansion and the reconstruction of the Pavillon de Flore.

Biography 
He was born in Versailles, the son of Alexandre Henry Lefuel (1782–1850), a building entrepreneur. He was admitted to the École des Beaux-Arts in 1829, studied there with Jean-Nicolas Huyot and in 1833 received second place in the Prix de Rome competition. By that time, his father died and he had to spend the next few years managing the family building business, which delayed the completion of his studies but also brought him valuable building experience. 

He won of the Prix de Rome in 1839 and subsequently spent the years 1840 to 1844 as a pensionary of the French Academy in Rome at the Villa Medici, together with Ernest Hébert (laureate in painting) and Charles Gounod (music). On his return to France he opened his own practice and was appointed a building inspector for the Chamber of Deputies.

Having carried out alterations as the Château de Meudon (1848) and for the housing of the Manufacture Royal de Porcelaine de Sèvres (1852), he was appointed chief architect of the Château de Fontainebleau, one of the residences of Napoleon III under the new monarchical Second French Empire regime; there he designed a new Imperial theatre (1853–1855). 

Following the sudden death of the architect Louis-Tullius-Joachim Visconti in 1853, Lefuel was placed in charge of the ambitious project of completing the Louvre. He kept Visconti's project but enriched it in profuse ornamental detail and completed the project in record time for opening in AUgust 1857, one of the showpieces of the Second Empire. Napoleon III then tasked him with the reconstruction of the pavillon de Flore and much of the Grande Galerie, which he completed by the late 1860s. Lefuel's work at the Louvre became an exemplar of the nascent Second Empire architectural style. Lefuel also created lavish apartments for the imperial household in the Palais des Tuileries, lost when that palace burned in the Paris Commune of 1871.

After the Tuileries Palace was destroyed by fire in 1871, Lefuel was in charge of the repairs to the pavillon de Flore and the symmetrical reconstruction of the pavillon de Marsan to the north, in 1874–1879.

He had been elected to the Académie des beaux-arts in 1855, taking the chair of Martin-Pierre Gauthier. He was made a chevalier of the Legion of Honour in 1854, and a Commander of the Legion in 1857.

Lefuel also designed and erected the hôtel particulier of Achille Fould, Minister of Finance under Napoléon III, and that of the museum director  Émilien de Nieuwerkerke (the Hôtel de Nieuwekerke in Parc Monceau) and the Hôtel Émonville in Abbeville.

He designed funeral monuments, such as that to the composers Daniel-François-Esprit Auber and François Bazin at Père Lachaise Cemetery.

His palace in Louis XIII style at Neudeck (Świerklaniec), Polish Silesia, built in 1868–1872, the grandest of three residences there of the Donnersmarcks, was burnt out in 1945 and demolished in 1961.

Hector Lefuel died in Paris and is buried at Passy Cemetery.

Gallery

Notes

Bibliography
 Aulanier, Christiane (1971). Histoire du Palais et du Musée du Louvre: Le Pavillon de Flore. Paris: Éditions des Musées nationaux. .
 Bautier, Genevieve Bresc (1995). The Louvre: An Architectural History. New York: The Vendome Press. .
 Mead, Christopher (1996). "Lefuel, Hector-Martin", vol.19, pp. 69–70 in The Dictionary of Art (reprinted with minor corrections in 1998), edited by Jane Turner. London: Macmillan. .

External links
 

19th-century French architects
1810 births
1880 deaths
People from Versailles
Burials at Passy Cemetery
Prix de Rome for architecture
Members of the Académie des beaux-arts
École des Beaux-Arts alumni
Commandeurs of the Légion d'honneur
People associated with the Louvre